Unhanagara Hatthadatha was King of Anuradhapura in the 7th century, whose reign lasted the year 691. He succeeded Aggabodhi IV as King of Anuradhapura and was succeeded by the first monarch from the House of Lambakanna II, Manavanna.

See also
 List of Sri Lankan monarchs
 History of Sri Lanka

References

External links
 Kings & Rulers of Sri Lanka
 Codrington's Short History of Ceylon

U
U
U
U